Reginald Boyne (16 November 1891 – 10 March 1963) was a New Zealand professional footballer who played as an inside forward in the Football League for Aston Villa and Brentford.

Career

Early years 

Boyne began his career in intermediate football in Auckland, New Zealand with Everton, which was named after the English club, before travelling to England to play junior football in Yorkshire.

Aston Villa 

Boyne joined high-flying First Division club Aston Villa on trial in August 1913 and was awarded a professional contract in December that year. He made his professional debut in a 1–0 defeat to Bradford City on 27 December 1913. Boyne made just three further appearances during the 1913–14 season and only managed four appearances during the whole of the 1914–15 season, before competitive football was suspended due to the ongoing First World War. Boyne made a further five wartime appearances for Villa, before departing in August 1919.

Guest appearances 
During the First World War, Boyne appeared as a guest for Notts County, Leicester Fosse and Loughborough Brush. He made 23 appearances and scored two goals in the Football League Midland Section for Leicester.

Brentford 
Boyne joined Southern League First Division club Brentford in August 1919. Despite suffering with knee trouble, Boyne had a good 1919–20 season, top-scoring with 13 goals. He was retained for the 1920–21 season and received another chance at league football, with Brentford having entered into the newly created Third Division. Boyne had the honour of scoring Brentford's first Football League goal, which came with the only goal of the game versus Millwall on 30 August 1920. In a dire debut season (at the end of which the Bees had to apply for re-election), Boyne scored 10 goals in 22 games. He was released in May 1921 and returned to New Zealand.

Personal life 
Born in Leeds as the eldest son of William Boyne and Mary Ellen Waddington, Boyne emigrated to New Zealand with his family at a young age. Boyne's father was president of the Everton club in Auckland, where he and both his younger brothers, Harold and William played before the First World War broke out. Harold was killed in action on the Western Front on 21 February 1917.

Career statistics

References

English footballers
Footballers from Leeds
Brentford F.C. players
English Football League players
Association football inside forwards
Aston Villa F.C. players
Notts County F.C. wartime guest players
Leicester City F.C. wartime guest players
Southern Football League players
1891 births
1963 deaths
New Zealand association footballers
Brush Sports F.C. players